Meet My Sister is a 1933 British comedy film directed by Jean Daumery and starring Clifford Mollison, Constance Shotter and Enid Stamp-Taylor. It was made at Welwyn Studios as a quota quickie by British International Pictures.

Synopsis
The screenplay concerns a man who comes to mistakenly believe that his fiancée is his sister.

Cast
 Clifford Mollison as Lord Victor Wilby
 Constance Shotter as Joan Lynton
 Enid Stamp-Taylor as Lulu Marsoc
 Fred Duprez as Hiram Sowerby
 Frances Drake as Helen Sowerby
 Jimmy Godden as Pogson
 Patrick Barr as Bob Seymour
 Helen Ferrers as Honorable Christine Wilby
 Syd Crossley as Butler

References

Bibliography
 Chibnall, Steve. Quota Quickies: The Birth of the British 'B' Film. British Film Institute, 2007.
 Low, Rachael. Filmmaking in 1930s Britain. George Allen & Unwin, 1985.
 Wood, Linda. British Films, 1927-1939. British Film Institute, 1986.

External links

1933 films
1933 comedy films
Films directed by Jean Daumery
British comedy films
British black-and-white films
1930s English-language films
1930s British films
Quota quickies
Films shot at Welwyn Studios